Herbert Burns (born February 2, 1988) is a Brazilian mixed martial artist currently competing in the Featherweight division of the Ultimate Fighting Championship. He is the younger brother of fellow UFC fighter, Gilbert Burns.

Background
Burns was born in Niterói, Brazil in 1988. He has two older brothers, Gilbert and Frederick, who both are also jiu-jitsu black belts. He played soccer and trained Shotokan karate under his father Herbert Sr. in his early childhood, eventually winning a state championship in the latter sport. As the interest in both sports gradually declined, Herbert started training Brazilian jiu-jitsu at the same time with his brothers when he was ten years old.

Mixed martial arts career

Early career
Burns made his professional debut in 2012 in the regional circuit, scoring a first-minute submission victory. After the debut, he was rapidly signed to ONE Championship where he amassed a record of 5–2 before transitioning stateside as his contract with the organization expired.

Burns signed a four-fight contract with the Titan FC in November 2018. He ended up fighting two bouts in the organization, winning both via submission.

Dana White's Contender Series
After the short tenure in Titan, Burns was invited to participate in the Dana White's Contender Series 23 on August 9, 2019. He faced Darrick Minner, winning the bout via first-round submission, earning a UFC contract with the performance.

Ultimate Fighting Championship
Burns made his UFC debut against fellow newcomer Nate Landwehr at UFC Fight Night: Blaydes vs. dos Santos on January 25, 2020. He won the fight via knockout in round one, for which he also earned the Performance of the Night bonus.

Burns faced Evan Dunham on June 6, 2020 at UFC 250 in a 150 lb catchweight bout. He won the bout via rear-naked choke submission in round one.

Burns faced Daniel Pineda on August 15, 2020 at UFC 252. He lost the fight via technical knockout in round two.

Burns was scheduled to face Billy Quarantillo on July 17, 2021 at UFC on ESPN 26. However, Burns pulled out in early June due to undisclosed reasons and was replaced by Gabriel Benítez.

As the first fight of his new four-fight contract, Burns was scheduled to face Khusein Askhabov on July 16, 2022 at UFC on ABC 3. However, after Askhabov pulled out due to injury, Burns was booked against Bill Algeo. Despite a tight triangle choke attempt, Burns lost the fight via technical knockout in round two after he was unable to return to his feet.

Personal life
Burns has a daughter, Isadora (born 2009).

Championships and accomplishments

Mixed martial arts
Ultimate Fighting Championship
Performance of the Night (One time) vs. Nate Landwehr

Mixed martial arts record

|-
|Loss
|align=center| 11–4
|Bill Algeo
|TKO (retirement)
|UFC on ABC: Ortega vs. Rodríguez
|
|align=center|2
|align=center|1:50
|Elmont, New York, United States
|
|-
| Loss
| align=center| 11–3
| Daniel Pineda
|TKO (elbows)
|UFC 252 
|
|align=center|2
|align=center|4:37
|Las Vegas, Nevada, United States
|
|-
| Win
| align=center| 11–2
| Evan Dunham
|Submission (rear-naked choke)
|UFC 250
|
|align=center| 1
|align=center| 1:20
|Las Vegas, Nevada, United States
|
|-
| Win
| align=center| 10–2
| Nate Landwehr
| KO (knee)
| UFC Fight Night: Blaydes vs. dos Santos
| 
| align=center| 1
| align=center| 2:43
| Raleigh, North Carolina, United States
|
|-
| Win
| align=center| 9–2
| Darrick Minner
| Submission (triangle armbar)
| Dana White's Contender Series 23
| 
| align=center| 1
| align=center| 2:29
| Las Vegas, Nevada, United States
|
|-
| Win
| align=center| 8–2
| Luis Gomez
| Submission (rear-naked choke)
| Titan FC 54
| 
| align=center| 1
| align=center| 2:24
| Fort Lauderdale, Florida, United States
|
|-
| Win
| align=center| 7–2
| Aibek Nurseit
| Submission (triangle armbar)
| Titan FC 51
| 
| align=center| 2
| align=center| 2:35
| Almaty, Kazakhstan
|
|-
| Loss
| align=center| 6–2
| Magomed Idrisov
| Decision (unanimous)
| ONE: Kings & Conquerors
| 
| align=center| 3
| align=center| 5:00
| Macau, SAR, China
|
|-
| Loss
| align=center| 6–1
| Movlid Khaybulaev
| Decision (unanimous)
| ONE: Throne of Tigers
| 
| align=center| 3
| align=center| 5:00
| Kuala Lumpur, Malaysia
|
|-
| Win
| align=center| 6–0
| Timofey Nastyukhin
| Submission (rear-naked choke)
| ONE: Odyssey of Champions
| 
| align=center| 1
| align=center| 3:26
| Jakarta, Indonesia
|
|-
| Win
| align=center| 5–0
| Honorio Banario
| Submission (rear-naked choke)
| ONE FC: Warrior's Way
| 
| align=center| 1
| align=center| 3:59
| Manila, Philippines
|
|-
| Win
| align=center| 4–0
| Hiroshige Tanaka
| Decision (unanimous)
| ONE FC: Reign of Champions
| 
| align=center| 3
| align=center| 5:00
| Dubai, United Arab Emirates
|
|-
| Win
| align=center| 3–0
| Harris Sarmiento
| Decision (unanimous)
| ONE FC: War of Nations
| 
| align=center| 3
| align=center| 5:00
| Kuala Lumpur, Malaysia
|
|-
| Win
| align=center| 2–0
| Edward Kelly
| Submission (rear-naked choke)
| ONE FC: Moment of Truth
| 
| align=center| 1
| align=center| 0:44
| Pasay, Philippines
|
|-
| Win
| align=center| 1–0
| Saulo Eduardo da Silva
| Submission (triangle armbar)
| Only Fighting Championship
| 
| align=center| 1
| align=center| 0:25
| Rio de Janeiro, Brazil
|
|-

See also
 List of current UFC fighters
 List of male mixed martial artists

References

External links

Living people
1988 births
Brazilian expatriate sportspeople in the United States
Brazilian male mixed martial artists
Brazilian male karateka
Brazilian practitioners of Brazilian jiu-jitsu
People awarded a black belt in Brazilian jiu-jitsu
Sportspeople from Niterói
Ultimate Fighting Championship male fighters
Featherweight mixed martial artists
Mixed martial artists utilizing Shotokan
Mixed martial artists utilizing Brazilian jiu-jitsu